The 2019 Clare Senior Football Championship was the 124th staging of the Clare Senior Football Championship since its establishment by the Clare County Board in 1887.

The 2018 champions, and holders of the Jack Daly Cup were St. Joseph's, Miltown Malbay who became the county champions for the second time in three years winning their fourteenth overall title.

In 2016 a Football Review Agreement decided that from 2019 onwards the Clare Senior and Intermediate Football Championships would both involve twelve teams in a effort to make both more competitive. This meant that five clubs would lose their senior status and be relegated down to the Clare Intermediate Football Championship. The eleven remaining senior clubs would be joined by the intermediate champions to form the new senior championship, and thereby increasing the intermediate championship from eight to twelve teams. 2018 saw the relegation of St. Joseph's, Doora-Barefield, Kilfenora, O'Curry's, St. Breckan's and Wolfe Tones down to Intermediate.

As part of the 2016 Football Review Agreement, a pathway was left open for any amalgamations that wished to enter the senior championship. Two intermediate clubs - Naomh Eoin, Cross & O'Curry's, Doonaha - both from the Loop Head Peninsula, took up this opportunity to compete together. According to the Clare GAA Master Fixtures Plan 2019, any amalgamations that enter a team are immune from relegation.

Senior Championship Fixtures

Group stage
 Each team plays all the other teams in their group once. Two points are awarded for a win and one for a draw.
 The top two teams in each group advance to Quarter-Finals
 The bottom team in each group contest Relegation Playoffs
 One group of four and three groups of three.
 2018 semi-finalists are seeded and kept separate.

Group A

Group B

Group C

Group D

Quarter-finals
 Played by top two placed teams from Groups A-D
 Four losers divert to Senior B Championship

Semi-finals

County Final

Other Fixtures

Senior B Championship 
 Played by four losers of Quarter-Finals

Relegation Playoffs 
 Played by the four bottom placed teams in Groups A-D.
 Win once to remain in Senior Championship for 2020
 Lose twice and relegated to Intermediate for 2020

References

External links

Clare Senior Football Championship
Clare Senior Football Championship
Clare SFC